Patient is a subsidiary of EMIS Health. First launching in 1996 as a directory of UK websites providing health related information, the company now provides digital healthcare products to the public in the form of Patient.info and Patient Access.

Patient.info

Patient.info is an online resource providing information on health, lifestyle, disease and other medical related topics. The website's aim is to provide members of the public with up-to-date information on health related topics in the form of comprehensive leaflets (which can be read online or printed), blogs, wellbeing advice and videos. Leaflets are compiled and reviewed by qualified medical practitioners with several years of experience in the medical profession. Users also have access to a symptom checker where they may attempt to self-diagnose any health condition they may have. As well as these resources, there is also a community forum to discuss any health topics with other users of the website, however healthcare professionals do not actively review this section.

Another section of the website contains articles and content geared towards medical professionals. These professional articles are typically written in a more technical manner, going into more specific detail and using more industry-specific language and jargon.

There is also a paid-for service called Patient Pro, where users may pay a monthly subscription fee in order to gain access to enhanced site capability.

Information on Patient.info is updated to keep abreast of the latest medical evidence, with each leaflet reviewed every two years or earlier when necessary (whichever comes first).

In 2013, the site appeared in a "Top 50 websites" feature published in The Times.

Patient Access

Patient Access is a service that enables users to connect with their GP online. It is available to users through a website, as well as a mobile app for iOS and Android.

Users are able to book appointments, order repeat prescriptions, send messages to their practice, and view their medical records remotely. Individual GP practices have control over which services they provide to their patients.

According to Patient, 'more than half' of practices in the UK are connected to Patient Access.

Awards

Patient claims to have won several awards for its content over several years from different award bodies.

 Which Joint Top Health Website - November 2010
 BMA Highly Commended Resource Award - BMA Patient Information Awards 2012
 The Times Top Health Website -  January 2013
 Website of the Year Awards 2014 - Best Health Website - November 2014
 Medilink Yorkshire and Humber Healthcare Business Awards 2013 - Harrison Goddard Innovation Award for Patient Access app - March 2014

References

External links

Patient Access

Medical and health organisations based in the United Kingdom
British medical websites
Internet properties established in 1997
1997 establishments in the United Kingdom
Patient